Kindred of the Ebony Kingdom is a source-book, alternative setting, and stand-alone pen-and-paper RPG designed for Vampire: The Masquerade, Vampire: The Dark Ages, and other games set in the Old World of Darkness developed by White Wolf Game Studios. It was released in 2003 and dealt with vampires throughout the continent of Africa (a location only briefly examined in previous Old World of Darkness games).

The Kindred of the Ebony Kingdom, known among themselves as the Laibon, are vampires native to Africa in the Old World of Darkness setting. Though having the same roots as the western Kindred (traditional vampires) and being afflicted with the same curse, the Laibon have existed in relative isolation from the western Kindred for an extended period, and have become distinct in a variety of ways. Additionally, they do not believe themselves descended from Caine (the first vampire), but rather view their existence in relation to various African myths and legends.

The most striking difference between the Laibon and the normal Vampire: The Masquerade Kindred is their tenuous balance between the world of mortals and that of the supernatural.  Unlike Kindred (who are most commonly defined in their adherence or violation of "Humanity"), the Laibon owe a dual loyalty to their mortal counterparts (called Aye) and loyalty to the spirit world (called Orun).  Failure on both loyalties leads to monstrous degeneration and feral predatory behavior.  High Aye causes a Laibon to appear alive, while high Orun causes a Laibon to appear unearthly and often demonic.  Those few Laibon who can maintain high Aye and high Orun simultaneously appear angelic, possibly transcendent.

Tenets of the Ebony Kingdom

Handed down for millennia, the Tenets represent the conservative status quo of Laibon society.  Recently brought into question by the rapid change of the modern world, they are nevertheless fiercely upheld by the Guruhi and the Shango.

 The Guruhi Are The Land: In other words, as the oldest Legacy, the Guruhi have a natural right to rule.
 Those Who Endure Judge:  Leadership and status is naturally assumed to derive from age and experience.
 Belonging Grants Protection:  More cynically, "citizenship implies fealty."  This Tenet helps ensure that power is not questioned and rulers not overthrown.
 The Secret Must Be Kept:  This is essentially a variation of the Masquerade, ensuring that mortals are not acutely aware of the existence of the undead.
 No Secrets From The Magaji:  The Magaji (dominant Laibon ruler of an area) has little to benefit from allowing scheming to occur, and this Tenet is enforced to keep the Magaji "in the know."
 Sires Command, Childer Inherit:  In other words, just as age determines leadership, lineage determines fealty.
 The Eldest Command Undeath:  A reinforcement of the rulership by the eldest, this explicit rule has come under considerable fire in recent times, and is treated delicately by wise Magaji.
 Travellers Obey The Tenets:  This twofold rule requires that Laibon away from home adhere to the Tenets, as do outsiders in the Ebony Kingdom.
 The Eldest Are Kholo:  This Tenet allows some flexibility in any given area's power structure, as travelling elders (particularly among the Kinyonyi) are granted due respect despite their not Belonging.

Legacies
Unlike the highly political clans of the western Kindred, Laibon can be divided into Legacies, which act more as extended familial relations than as unified factions.  These Legacies are bound by a common lineage and curse, but hold no overwhelming loyalty to one another.

Akunanse
The Akunanse are one of the legacies of Laibon. They take their name and nature from the myths of the "wise spider" of many African folk-tales. They are known for their great knowledge, wise counsel, and non-political natures. Of all of the Laibon, they are the ones least concerned with the Jyhad, and the least organized overall. However, like Anansi, the spider-god from which they take their name, they are not above utilizing cunning and clever trickery to do the impossible. The Akunanse probably originated in the Ghana region, but are now widespread throughout the whole of Africa, and are known to frequently travel anywhere in pursuit of the knowledge they need. They will Embrace most any who follow the pursuit of knowledge, including non-Africans who want to understand more about the ways of the "cradle of humanity" - curiously non African Akunanse often adopt animal features from their homelands instead of those native to the African regions that they travel. Akunanse adopt trends at a much slower rate than mortals do, however, and many of the Akunanse favor traditional garb over the more disposable fashions of the modern world.

They are perhaps the most disordered of the Laibon, the only type of legacy affiliation they maintain is the occasional exchange of information if they cross another Akunanse's path. Beyond that they are often too wrapped up in their own eternal search to care about any kind of formal order that is not natural. They lead nomadic lives, constantly traveling to learn more about the origin of humankind, but in doing so, the more they lose touch with their own humanity due to their clan weakness. Akunanse maintain single dwellings among the kine, though an elder often makes do with any suitable den he finds along his travels. Elders who share animalistic traits with similar Akunanse might share their dens if appropriate, but most guard their solitary lairs with ferocious intensity.

They have many features in common with Clan Gangrel, especially their weakness; like the Gangrel, the Akunanse gain animalistic features the longer they live. Unlike the Gangrel, however, the Akunanse gain theirs through experience; if they reside in an area for a long period and gain great knowledge there over time, they will eventually pick up a feature of an animal that is indigenous to the region.

While a majority of the Akunanse maintain their control due to their changes, a few have been overwhelmed with their knowledge and lost themselves to the Beast. Many other Laibon believe the Akunanse waste their time in tracing fairy-tales and mock their bestial appearance. Most other Legacies view them as aloof and foolish.

Note, in the revised edition of Clanbook: Ravnos (published 3 years before Kindred of the Ebony Kingdom), an African tribe of Kindred named after Anansi were identified as a Ravnos bloodline. This was ret-conned with the release of Kindred of the Ebony Kingdom.

Children of Damballah

A West African offshoot of the Followers of Set, the Damballans are centered in the area of Nigeria and Benin, with their founding temple in Oyo, the one-time capital of the old Yoruba Kingdom.  They worship Damballah-Wedo, the Yoruban snake-god, and his wife Aida-Wedo, the rainbow serpent.  Very few elder members remember or know of Set and their Egyptian relations.  They attribute their supernatural powers to Damballah-Wedo and Aida-Wedo, and its members are promised that eventually they will become gods themselves.  At one point in the early 20th century, the main clan tried to bring this bloodline back within its ranks, but the Children of Damballah refused, and they have been separated since.

Guruhi
Taking their name from the Gambian god from whom they claim to descend, the Guruhi believe themselves to be the masters of Africa, the rightful ruler of its lands and people. They share their lands with the other Laibon reluctantly, though they do have something of an alliance with the Osebo and the Shango. Those they Embrace may come from any African ethnic background, but tend to be those in positions of authority or who can trace their ancestry back to one of the great dynasties. The Guruhi are mostly unified, despite an old legend which says there are two "lines" of Guruhi. The second line was supposed to take over Africa, replacing the original line when it was deemed "unfit". This division is mostly forgotten and rarely taken seriously, except by a few Guruhi fanatics.

The Guruhi seem to share a weakness with Clan Nosferatu, though theirs is much more complicated. The appearance of a Guruhi changes based on their moods, reflected by their Orun and Aye; a Guruhi in a good mood with high Orun appears normal or may even possess unearthly beauty. However, one with a low Aye is revealed as a monstrous creature, much like the Nosferatu.

Ishtarri
The Ishtarri claim to be descended from the Babylonian goddess Ishtar, but currently lack the personal connection with Africa that the similar Guruhi have. The Ishtarri are the only Laibon legacy that are not native to Africa; however, through manipulation and diplomacy, they have become an important part of Laibon culture. Most Ishtarri seem to specialize in information; they consider spying an essential pastime, and usually have many valuable contacts and allies to exploit as needed. There is also no Laibon group more infatuated with mortals than the Ishtarri; many feel the need to keep a constant connection to the kine, even as the other Laibon tend to shun them. Those who are Embraced by the Ishtarri tend to claim those who they want to be among their ranks, but not necessarily those who are best for the legacy. The especially beautiful are a common target, but so are those who represent a vice the Ishtarri find irresistible.

The Ishtarri seem to be a combination of the weaknesses of the Toreador and Ravnos clans. Like the Ravnos, the Ishtarri each have a vice that they absolutely must indulge, less it drive them mad, however such vices focus on the beautiful and/or sensual, giving them something in common with the Toreador.

Kinyonyi
The Kinyonyi take their name from the Luganda word for "bird", reflecting their tendencies to constantly travel, even more than the knowledge-seeking Akunanse. The Kinyonyi usually work as messengers, can seek out special items, or carry out jobs, illegal or legal, for other Laibon. The Kinyonyi are said to have migrated centuries ago from the East, and some believe they are connected to the Rom, and perhaps to Clan Ravnos; their ability to use Chimerstry hints strongly at this. In spite of their outsider status, the Kinyonyi have been around long enough to integrate themselves completely in with Laibon society, unlike the relative-newcomers, the Ishtarri. In terms of the Embrace, the Kinyonyi are drawn towards the self-sufficient and those who have useful skills of almost any kind.

The Kinyonyi also maintain a loose network among their legacy; if one needs something they cannot find themselves, they can easily contact another Kinyonyi who can procure it for them. They meet every so often to compare notes, swap stories, and trade "business" tips.

The Kinyonyi are welcome almost anywhere, but if they stay in an area for too long, they are prone to driving themselves away through a lack of tact; a wrong comment might even result in them being hunted down. It is this weakness that keeps them constantly on the move. In addition, a few years ago, several members of the legacy were struck by a bloodthirst from an unknown cause, resulting in diableries and frenzies that took down their numbers, especially elders. Some Kinyonyi now remain aloof from the legacy, afraid to be around others if such an event happens again.

Mla Watu

Perhaps no group of Laibon is shunned as much as the Mla Watu. Although the Laibon are removed from their humanity, they still have a healthy respect for the dead as many African customs demand. The Mla Watu are not content to merely communicate with dead ancestors; they seek to do the blasphemous and control them. Other Laibon fear their spirits would fall into the hands of the Mla Watu after their Final Death. It is both of these factors that cause the Laibon to give the Ghost-Eaters a wide berth. The Mla Watu themselves are content to remain the subject of fear; it gives them the solitude they prefer to continue their studies of knowledge in general and the dead in particular. Embracing among Mla Watu is fairly limited, but those chosen usually have a close connection with death, usually through their occupations.

Like the extinct Clan Cappadocian, the weakness of the Mla Watu is to develop a corpse-like pallor. Older Mla Watu can look like little more than walking cadavers; needless to say, this causes them to stand out quite a bit among the Laibon and make them easy to avoid.

The Mla Watu practice The Path of Abombo path of Necromancy. This path focuses on the connection between the dead and the living; similar to but distinct from The Cenotaph Path.

Nagloper
Taking their name from the Khoikhoin word for "evil sorcerer", the Naglopers live up to their reputation as the most horrifying of the Laibon. They allow the Beast to dominate them, leading them into causing any debauchery one can imagine, and some were only thought possible in nightmares. Torture is a particular favorite of most Naglopers, particularly on those who intrude into their personal territory. The other Laibon generally steer clear of the Horrors as much as possible. Strong lone-wolf types are the favorite target for a Nagloper Embrace.

Naglopers are closely tied with the asanbonsam of Ashanti legend, a horrific creature resembling a man with hooked feet. The asanbonsam would use their appendages to reach down and snatch passerby to feast on their bodies. The Naglopers have been known to reshape their lower bodies with Vicissitude to do this as well, but a favorite torture is to take a victim, reshape them into the asanbonsam form, and promise to restore them if they act out the legend on innocents. More often than not, a torture victim will end up ghouled, dead, or the target of further, more horrific tortures.

As well as Vicissitude, the Naglopers have much in common with Clan Tzimisce. Like the Fiends, the Naglopers must burrow into the earth and rest there at least once a day or be weakened. Unlike the Tzimisce, the Naglopers do not need to rest in the earth of their birthplace.

Nkulu Zao

The Nkulu Zao are one of the minor legacies of Laibon. The childer of the nearly extinct line of Zao-lat, the Nkulu Zao's numbers are few after their legacy has been hunted down for centuries. Their very name is in honor of their founder; Nkulu Zao is Bavili for "dead souls of Zao-lat". In order to hide from the magi who decimated their numbers, the Nkulu Zao remain highly secretive. So secretive, in fact, that even they do not know how many of them remain in Africa, let alone the rest of the world. They remain solitary, desperate to survive, to the point they have let the Tremere's rumors come true. The Nkulu Zao are genuine soul-suckers, taking the soul of any who threaten their safety. The Soulsuckers do not even trust one another, so Embraces are extremely rare; the few who are, were chosen for no reason other than their sire saw them as capable of saving the Nkulu Zao from themselves, perhaps even through Final Death.

The Nkulu Zao's weakness is that they may only take blood from a willing subject; those Soulsuckers who force vitae from a target receive no sustenance from it, and may even degenerate. Unlike their Western counterparts, the third eye that Saulot's progeny are known for has mostly disappeared from the bloodline, although a rare Nkulu Zao may actually have a functional one.

Osebo
The warriors of the Laibon, the Osebo take their name from the famous leopard of West Ashanti legend. Although they are proud of their traditions and will defend them stubbornly, they depend on the other Laibon, particularly the Guruhi, as a focus for their energies. Left to their own devices, the Osebo are known for indulging the Beast and causing massive amounts of mayhem among the mortal population; kidnapping and murder are the usual pastimes of the patronless Osebo. The Osebo tend to be attracted towards mortals who are salt-of-the-earth types, although many Osebo were Embraced on a whim or were the victim of the Osebo's cradle-robbing habits.

Like Clan Brujah, the Osebo are prone to frenzy more often than other Laibon. Combined with their prowess as warriors, an Osebo frenzy is a terrifying thing to behold.

Shango
Worshippers of Shango, the Yoruba god of storms, the Shango are perhaps the most civilized legacy of Laibon next to the aristocratic Guruhi. Because of their similar outlooks, both legacies work closely together to achieve major goals. The Shango are also accomplished sorcerers, as their ability to use Dur-An-Ki indicates, and they are the only Laibon with Obfuscate, making them the subject of many rumors among the other Laibon as to what exactly they are capable of. For their part, the Shango are perfectly content to be the target of mystery, as their abilities let them into places closed to many other Laibon. Most Shango are Embraced from the ranks of Yoruba - god of storms, magic, and war - worshipers, though worthy warriors and sorcerers from other religions are found acceptable.

Called "Judges" by other Laibon, the Shango dispense judgment over Laibon who are foolish enough to overstep their bounds of plausibility with mortals or who defy their magaji. While most Shango are usually willing to help their fellow Laibon for a price, it's common knowledge that they are not to be trifled with.

The Shango have much in common with Clan Assamite, but of particular note is their addiction to vitae. It is quite easy for a Shango looking for sustenance to drain a victim dry in a blood frenzy; some Laibon and kindred are known to exploit this weakness into forcing a Shango into an unwitting blood bond.

Many Shango follow The Evil Eye path of Dur-An-Ki, although they are not limited to The Evil Eye. This path inflicts a number of baleful curses on victims.

Xi Dundu
Taking their name from the Bavili word for "shadow", the Xi Dundu originally hailed from the Congo until a rite gone wrong forced them from their homelands. They now make their home among the Maasai peoples of eastern Africa. Because of their ordeals, no legacy is as unified as the Xi Dundu. The Xi Dundu are aggressive overall, and seek to supplant the Guruhi as the Laibon rulers of Africa. Ambitious, sneaky, and able to adapt to non-traditional situations, the Xi Dundu may very well pull it off. Those prized for Embrace include the ruthless, shrewd, and manipulative from any background.

Clan Lasombra resembles the Xi Dundu, and the weakness of the Xi Dundu is similar to the Lasombra weakness of casting no reflection; the Xi Dundu cast no shadow of any sort. They also must not be touched by their native soil when they rest else they are greatly weakened; this is perhaps a further reflection of their original banishing; and a curious contrast to the Tzimisce weakness.

Other factions 

In addition, a handful of minor influences exist in the Ebony Kingdom.  Some clans also maintain a presence on the dark continent living an existence at the fringes of Laibon society.

Ghiberti

While not a Laibon legacy, the Ghiberti bloodline of the clan Giovanni has a strong presence in West Africa. They have the same disciplines as their parent clan but can also follow the Cenotaph Path of Necromancy. This path allows the necromancer control and even reassignment of a wraith's fetter.   Ghiberti have extensive experience dealing with wraiths from the Dark Kingdom of Ivory.

Malkavian

Another clan ostensibly led into the Ebony Kingdom by a self-made messiah known as "Arcus", they exist in scattered clusters, seeking the "lost secrets" of the Dark Continent.

Ventrue

The remnants of the Age of Colonization, some Ventrue have gone native, but still remain a clan. Their ancestry and outsider status limits their potential.

Laibon bloodline
When first introduced in Vampire: the Dark Ages, the Laibon were presented as a bloodline of wandering wise men and shaman from Africa. Since the publication of Kindred of the Ebony Kingdom, Laibon has become the blanket term for all African Kindred, who belong to one of several different lineages. Although the Laibon remain an option for Dark Ages game, they probably represent the wandering Akunanse Lineage. European and Islamic Cainites simply view the occasional visitors from Africa as a "mere" bloodline in their arrogance.

Reception

Backstab was critical of the game, saying that while it had a good concept, it was poorly implemented in the book, with information often being hard to find and embedded in pieces of short fiction, and compared it unfavorably to the earlier game Kindred of the East.

In November 2004, Hindmarch's work on Victorian Age: Vampire and Kindred of the Ebony Kingdom led to him getting the position of line developer of White Wolf Publishing's then-flagship title Vampire: The Requiem, succeeding Achilli.

References

 Justin Achilli et al., Kindred of the Ebony Kingdom, (White Wolf Game Studio, 2003)
 Robert Hatch et al., A World of Darkness (Second Edition), (White Wolf Game Studio, 1996)

Vampire: The Masquerade
Role-playing games introduced in 2003